The 2010 Southwestern Athletic Conference men's basketball tournament took place March 10–13 at the CenturyTel Center in Bossier City, Louisiana. The winner of the tournament Arkansas-Pine Bluff receives the Southwestern Athletic Conference's automatic bid to the 2010 NCAA tournament. The Championship game will be broadcast on ESPNU.

Bracket

2009–10 Southwestern Athletic Conference men's basketball season
SWAC men's basketball tournament